Algeria competed at the 2020 Summer Paralympics in Tokyo, Japan, from 24 August to 5 September 2021.

Medallists

| width=75% align=left valign=top |

| width=25% align=left valign=top |

Competitors
Source:

Athletics 

22 athlete in 31 events:

Goalball 

Algeria men's and women's team qualified via 2020 IBSA African Championship held in Port Said, Egypt.

Women's 
On Wednesday 21 April 2021 the International Blind Sports Federation received a 'notification of a late withdrawal of one of the women's teams from the Tokyo 2020 Paralympic Games'.  Several days later the International Paralympic Committee announced the withdrawal of the women's team from Algeria, and that Egypt received the slot.  No reason behind the team's withdrawal was indicated.

Men's

Group stage

Judo

Powerlifting

Wheelchair basketball 

The men's and women's team qualified after winning the gold medal at the 2020 African Zonal Championship held in Johannesburg, South Africa.

Summary

Men 

Team roster
Mostefa Abassi
Abderraouf Abbad
Bilel Ayache
Hakim Badache
Ayoub Badrane
Oussama Baghradji
Abdennour Benredouane
Nabil Guedoun
Samir Ladjadjat
Rafik Mansouri
Abdelkarim Megueddem
Omar Zidi

Women 

Team roster
Samiha Abdelali
Hafida Belhadef
Nourhane Boublal
Fatima Bouzidi
Yamina Ghoul
Halima Kedjoun
Naoual Khedir
Djamila Khemgani
Nebia Mehimda
Zohra Sellami
Dahbia Semati
Kheira Zairi

See also 
Algeria at the Paralympics
Algeria at the 2020 Summer Olympics

References 

Nations at the 2020 Summer Paralympics
2020
2021 in Algerian sport